Charles Willocks (28 June 1919 – 25 August 1991) was a New Zealand rugby union player. A lock, Willocks represented Otago at a provincial level, and was a member of the New Zealand national side, the All Blacks, from 1946 to 1949. He played 22 matches for the All Blacks including five internationals.

References

1919 births
1991 deaths
Sportspeople from Balclutha, New Zealand
People educated at South Otago High School
New Zealand rugby union players
New Zealand international rugby union players
Otago rugby union players
Rugby union locks
Rugby union players from Otago